La granja (lit:The Farm) is a Chilean reality television programme aired on Canal 13 from 4 January to 19 April 2005, coproduced with Promofilm. The series is based on the original Swedish television show Farmen and it was presented by Sergio Lagos.

Finishing order

Nominations 

¹: Flavia and Marcela tied for votes from their peers. Arturo, a foreman, had to choose the first nominee.
²: Matías and Paula did not want to grieve and both left the farm.

External links
https://web.archive.org/web/20110831113925/http://lagranja.canal13.cl/

The Farm (franchise)
Chilean reality television series
2005 Chilean television series debuts
2005 Chilean television series endings